The 2022 NHRA Gatornationals also known as the Amalie Motor Oil Gatornationals for sponsorship reasons were a National Hot Rod Association (NHRA) drag racing event, held at Gainesville Raceway in Gainesville, Florida on March 14, 2022.

Results

Top Fuel

Funny Car

Pro Stock

Notes 

NHRA Gatornationals

Gatornationals